Church Cottage or Church Cottages may refer to:
Church Cottage, Tutshill, listed building in Gloucestershire, England
Church Cottage, Eccleston, listed building in Cheshire, England
Church Cottage Museum, listed building and museum in Lancashire, England
Church Cottages, York, listed building in York, England
Church View and Church Cottages, listed building in Barnet, London, England

See also
Ferron Presbyterian Church and Cottage, Utah, United States